

This is a list of the National Register of Historic Places listings in Franklin County, Ohio.

This is a list of the properties and districts on the National Register of Historic Places in Franklin County, Ohio, United States. Latitude and longitude coordinates are provided for many National Register properties and districts; these locations may be seen together in an online map.

There are 350 properties and districts listed on the National Register in Franklin County, including 3 National Historic Landmarks. The city of Columbus is the location of 174 of these properties and districts, including all of the National Historic Landmarks; they are listed separately, while the remaining 176 properties and districts are listed here.

Current listings

Columbus

Exclusive of Columbus

|}

See also

 List of National Historic Landmarks in Ohio
 Listings in neighboring counties: Delaware, Fairfield, Licking, Madison, Pickaway, Union
 National Register of Historic Places listings in Ohio

References

 
Franklin